Miriam Soares (born 4 May 1965), commonly known as Miriam, is a Brazilian footballer who played as a goalkeeper for the  Brazil women's national football team. She was part of the team at the 1991 FIFA Women's World Cup. At the club level, she played for EC Radar in Brazil.

References

External links
 

1965 births
Living people
Brazilian women's footballers
Brazil women's international footballers
Place of birth missing (living people)
1991 FIFA Women's World Cup players
Women's association football goalkeepers